The Isle St. George AVA is an American Viticultural Area located on North Bass Island, Ohio, an island in Lake Erie.  The only town on the Ottawa County island is also called Isle Saint George, although the "Saint" in the AVA name must be abbreviated as "St." to be used on wine labels.  Over half of the island used to be planted with grapevines. Now only 44% of the island has grapes. Lake Erie is warmer than the other Great Lakes, providing a moderating and warming effect on the local climate.  Temperatures on the island during the growing season can be warmer than on the mainland.  Cool climate varietals such as Catawba, Delaware, Gewürztraminer, Pinot noir, and Riesling are the most important in Isle St. George.

References

American Viticultural Areas
Ohio wine
Geography of Ottawa County, Ohio
1982 establishments in Ohio